The European Junior Championship is an American football tournament contested by the national teams of European nations. It was founded in 1992, and is held every two years.

Results

See also
 IFAF Europe

 
American football competitions in Europe
Biennial sporting events
Recurring sporting events established in 1992
1992 establishments in Europe